Merdrignac is a commune in the Côtes-d'Armor department of Brittany in northwestern France.

Geography
The River Meu forms most of the commune's northern border.

Climate
Merdrignac has a oceanic climate (Köppen climate classification Cfb).

Population

Inhabitants of Merdrignac are called merdrignaciens in French.

See also
Communes of the Côtes-d'Armor department

References

External links

Communes of Côtes-d'Armor